Stephen McCann (1919–1991) was a Democratic politician from Pennsylvania. Born in Waynesburg, he lived for most of his life in Carmichaels, a southwestern Pennsylvania coal mining town. From 1952 to 1963, he represented Greene County in the state House of Representatives. In 1959, he was chosen as Majority Leader.

McCann stepped down from his post to run for Lieutenant Governor in 1962; he was the running-mate of Richardson Dilworth, who lost the gubernatorial campaign for the second time in his career. After leaving elected office, he became closely aligned with the coal industry and long served as a lobbyist for mining corporations.

References

1991 deaths
1919 births
People from Waynesburg, Pennsylvania
People from Greene County, Pennsylvania
20th-century American politicians
Democratic Party members of the Pennsylvania House of Representatives